Gong Maoxin and Zhang Ze were the defending champions but lost in the quarterfinals to Ruben Gonzales and Alex Lawson.

Max Purcell and Luke Saville won the title after defeating Sriram Balaji and Hans Hach Verdugo 6–2, 7–6(7–5) in the final.

Seeds

Draw

References

External links
 Main draw

International Challenger Zhangjiagang - Doubles
2019 Doubles